Chesapeake Shipbuilding is a shipbuilding company, based in Salisbury, Maryland, United States, since 1980, on the site of the former Roberts Shipyard. They are capable of constructing vessels up to 450 feet in length on the 13 acre yard.  The yard includes  of deepwater bulkhead along the Wicomico River. The company was contracted in 2022 to build 12 new hybrid catamaran cruise ships for United States waters. In addition to cruise ships, the company also builds tug boats.

Vessels
Notable vessels constructed include:
 American Splendor
 Independence
 Queen of the Mississippi (2015)
 Queen of the Mississippi (2017)
 Woodland Ferry

References

External links 
 Official web site of Chesapeake Shipbuilding

Manufacturing companies based in Maryland
Shipbuilding companies of the United States
Shipyards of the United States
Salisbury, Maryland
Organizations established in 1980
 
Industrial buildings and structures in Maryland